Weekly News is generally a title given to a newspaper that is published on a weekly basis. Some examples of newspapers with Weekly News in their title include:

Turks and Caicos Islands
Turks and Caicos Weekly News

United Kingdom

The Weekly News, a national newspaper published each Thursday in the United Kingdom
Fleetwood Weekly News in Fleetwood, Lancashire
Newbury Weekly News in Newbury and West Berkshire
North Wales Weekly News in North Wales
Strabane Weekly News and Tyrone & Donegal Reporter in Strabane, Northern Ireland
Wellington Weekly News in Wellington, Somerset

United States
Bilingual Weekly News, a Spanish and English language newspaper covering San Joaquin and Stanislaus Counties in the California Central Valley.
Weekly World News, supermarket tabloid newspaper